The Dolgopolsky list is a word list compiled by Aharon Dolgopolsky in 1964. It lists the 15 lexical items that have the most semantic stability, i.e. they are the 15 words least likely to be replaced by other words as a language evolves. It was based on a study of 140 languages from across Eurasia.

List
The words, with the first being the most stable, are:

I/me
two/pair
you (singular, informal)
who/what
tongue
name
eye
heart
tooth
no/not
nail (finger-nail)
louse/nit
tear/teardrop
water
dead

The first item in the list, I/me, has been replaced in none of the 140 languages during their recorded history; the fifteenth, dead, has been replaced in 25% of the languages.

The twelfth item, louse/nit, is well kept in the North Caucasian languages, Dravidian and Turkic, but not in some other proto-languages.

See also
Leipzig–Jakarta list
Swadesh list
Comparative linguistics

References

External links
Concepticon

Word lists
Linguistics lists